The Official Bulletin of the Community of Madrid (BOCM) is the government gazette of the regional administration of the Community of Madrid, Spain. According to the article #40 of the regional statute of the Community of Madrid, the BOCM publishes the laws passed by the Assembly of Madrid and the rulings issued by the Government of the Community of Madrid.

It adheres to the following general structure:

It is typically published daily except Sundays, Good Friday, Christmas Day, and New Year's Day. Its premises are located at the calle de Valportillo in Alcobendas and at 51 calle de Fortuny in Madrid.

References 

Government gazettes of Spain
Administration of the Community of Madrid
Spanish-language newspapers published in Spain